Dashtabi-e Gharbi Rural District is a rural district (dehestan) in Dashtabi District, Buin Zahra County, Qazvin Province, Iran. At the 2006 census, its population was 9,753, in 2,370 families.  The rural district has 22 villages.

References 

Rural Districts of Qazvin Province
Buin Zahra County